Ross Global Academy Charter School, Ross Global, or RGA, was a public charter school located in Lower Manhattan. It opened in September 2006 with  more than 160 students and its enrollment eventually grew to 400. It was closed in 2011 by New York City and state officials for various reasons, including poor performance.

The school was developed in collaboration with New York University's Steinhardt School and Ross School in East Hampton, which follows a spiral curriculum designed by William Thompson and Ralph Abraham. The school was initially slated to be housed in the same building as the NEST+m school, in the Lower East Side, a controversial decision which was eventually revised.

In its inception, the school was housed within the New York City Department of Education's headquarters, the Tweed Courthouse at 52 Chambers Street. The school began its 2006–2007 school year at full enrollment on September 4, 2006, with students in grades K, 1, 2, 6, and 7.  It was a project of the Ross School in East Hampton.  RGA was founded by Courtney Sale Ross, who is a philanthropist and the widow of Steve Ross, the former CEO of Time-Warner.

By 2009, RGA had expanded to serve grades K-8, and had moved to a new building on East 11th Street in the Lower East Side, which it stayed in until it closed in 2011. While the new building was beautifully designed, educational and behavioral issues were not up to standards. RGA asserted that the closure was due to a conflict of interest with the leadership of Girls Prep who were slated to occupy the building.

References

External links

Educational institutions established in 2006
Defunct schools in New York City
Public elementary schools in Manhattan
Public middle schools in Manhattan
K–8 schools in New York City
Public K–8 schools in the United States
2006 establishments in New York City